An Automotive textile is a technical textile used in the transportation and automotive industries. The choice of type of automotive textile focuses on aspects of safety, comfort, and aesthetics. These textiles have variety of applications in the automotive industry, such as interior fittings, safety features, sound insulation, and tire reinforcement.

Material and performance parameters 

Certain performance parameters are required for automotive textiles. Different needs are filled by different types of fiber and structures.

High tensile materials are used for airbags. Truck covers are made with PVC or coated polyester material. Textiles are also used for trunk coverings (often needle felts) and cargo tie downs. Many coated and reinforced textiles are used in materials for engines such as air ducts, timing belts, and air filters. Non-woven textiles are used for cabin air filtration and engine sound isolation.

 Abrasion resistance
 Colorfastness to light and rubbing
 UV protection
 Tear and tensile strength and seam strength
 Flame resistance
 Anti-static
Stretch and recovery
Soil and stain release.

Textiles are also used in the interior of cars, the most obvious uses being for seat covers, safety belts and airbags. Automotive textiles share similarities with home textiles but with stringent quality parameters. Automotive textiles use high-performance fibers, polyester, nylon produced by knitting, warp knitting, weaving or nonwovens.

Synthetic fibers

Nylon 
Nylon fibers, which are strong, tough, resilient, and elastic, are the most commonly used fiber type in automotive textiles.

Polyester 
Polyester is appropriate for upholstery and seat cushions because it is a strong material with satisfactory colorfastness properties.

High performance fibers

Aramid 
Hoses require strong, chemical-resistant materials such as polyester, rayon, or aramid.

Carbon 
Woven fabrics and composites of carbon fiber are used in car parts.

Composite materials 
Composite materials are formed by combining materials to create an overall structure with properties that differ from individual components.  Composite materials are used in headliners of the vehicles.

Others

Leather and other alternatives 
For seat covers, pure leather and imitated leather, and suede finished fabric is used. Ultrasuede is a type of suede material that is used in automobile and aircraft seats.

Polyurethane is  used for foam.

Blends or hybrid materials 
To achieve certain functional characteristics, blended (mix of two types of fibers)  covering materials are also used in automotive textiles.

Laminated and coated materials 
Laminated and coated materials are also used in Automotive sector. Examples are Truck covers (PVC coated PES fabrics) and seat covers made of  Alcantara (material).

Use 
Cars, and buses have a large use of automotive textiles. A car can consume up to 25 kg of fabric, primarily used for roof coverings and upholstery. Automotive textiles also used in interior trimmings, seats, side panels, carpets, and car trunk coverings, linings, tires, filters, belts, hoses, airbags, etc.

Due to specific performance requirements, different types of fibres are chosen for various sections.

See also 

 Automotive safety

References 

Textiles